Sheinton is a small rural village and civil parish just outside Telford, and within Shropshire. 

It is situated on the south bank of the River Severn opposite the Wrekin, a notable Shropshire landmark. In October 2008 its historic bridge collapsed into the Hughley Brook.

Etymology 
The name comes from the Saxon shena – tun, meaning "beautiful place".

The Village 
The village is small and has a large amount of agricultural land. The soil is mainly sand and loam however the more elevated parts are mostly strong clay. The parish council is combined with the neighbouring parish of Cressage. The population of Sheinton, according to the 2001 census, is 273.

Amenities 
There are limited services in Sheinton village, however there are many facilities such as pubs and restaurants, hotels, shops and cinemas, schools and a doctor's surgery close by in the neighbouring villages Cressage and Much Wenlock. The nearest train stations are Wellington Shropshire railway station (5.40 miles) and Telford Central railway station (6.60 miles).

St Peter and Paul's Church 
St Peter and Paul's church is a Grade II* listed building. Standing high on a natural mound overlooking the Seven Valley this mediaeval church was restored and altered in the 19th century. The church was partly rebuilt in the 1660s and later thoroughly restored in 1854.

The church contains a framed Roll of Honour on the north wall listing local men who served in the First World War, and, on the opposite wall, a brass war memorial plaque to seven men who died serving in the same war.

Sheinton Bridge 
In October 2008 the Sheinton brook became a raging torrent after exceptionally heavy precipitation fell over Shropshire. The force of the water caused one of the supporting piers for the brick-built bridge to collapse across the brook. The collapse began on 23 October while engineers were repairing the damaged foundations; a crack was noticed along the structure minutes before it collapsed.

The bridge's collapse caused great disruption to local residents of Sheinton who faced inconvenient diversions to commute to and from the county town of Shrewsbury. However, Shropshire County Council acted quickly and a temporary road bridge and approaches were built in the fields alongside the old bridge. The damage caused to the old bridge was so extensive that repairing it was not an option.
The two-pier bridge was listed, therefore it had to be redesigned in the same style, using the same type of materials, and listed building consent had to be obtained. The whole process took months and approval by the Environment Agency was needed.

Climate 
The closest weather station to Sheinton is located in Shawbury, which is the main weather station for the whole of Shropshire. The climate for Shropshire is very similar throughout, where locally the coldest nights around Shawbury fall to −9.6c.

Notable people 
Benjamin Bailey, missionary to Kerala, India, and an important figure in the history of the Malayalam language, was rector of Sheinton from after his return to England in 1850 to his death in 1871.

See also 
 Listed buildings in Sheinton

References 

Villages in Shropshire
Civil parishes in Shropshire